Odontaspis (from   'tooth') and   'shield')  is a genus of sand shark with two extant species.

Description

They are large-bodied sharks with long, conical snouts, broad-based dorsal and anal fins, and an asymmetrical caudal fin with a strong lower lobe.

Their teeth are large, with prominent narrow cusps.

They are distinguished from the similar genus Carcharias by the absence of crushing posterior teeth.

These bottom dwelling, deepwater sharks can be found in temperate and tropical waters of all the oceans.

Extant species
 Odontaspis ferox (A. Risso, 1810) (smalltooth sand tiger)
 Odontaspis noronhai (Maul, 1955) (bigeye sand tiger)

Extinct species
Extinct species within this genus include:

 Odontaspis aculeatus Capetta & Case, 1975
 Odontaspis speyeri (Dartevelle & Casier, 1943)
 Odontaspis winkleri Leriche, 1905

Fossils of Odontaspis have been found all over the world. These extinct sand sharks lived from the Cretaceous to the Quaternary periods (from 136.4 to 0.012 Ma). Fossils of these fishes have been found worldwide.

See also

 List of prehistoric cartilaginous fish

References

 
Odontaspididae
Extant Cretaceous first appearances
Shark genera
Taxa named by Louis Agassiz
Mooreville Chalk